The Free Democratic Party (HDP), was a center-right liberal political party in Turkish Republic of Northern Cyprus. The party was founded after 1990 elections by İsmet Kotak.

The Free Democratic Party was successor of the Progressive People's Party and its electoral bloc Democratic Struggle Party. After dissolution of the Free Democratic Party, founder İsmet Kotak and his friends joined the Democratic Party.

References

1990 establishments in Northern Cyprus
Political parties established in 1990
Liberal parties in Northern Cyprus
Defunct political parties in Northern Cyprus